Eligius may refer to:
 Saint Eligius (c. 588–659), Catholic patron saint of goldsmiths and other metalworkers
 Eligius Franz Joseph von Münch-Bellinghausen (1806–1871), known als Friedrich Halm, Austrian dramatist, poet and short-story writer
 Eligius Fromentin (c. 1767–1822), American politician

Masculine given names